Georgi Nikitovich Bolshakov (1922–1989) was a Soviet GRU officer under journalist cover who was posted to Washington, D.C., twice, most significantly in the early 1960s. In this capacity, he played a major role in diplomacy between the United States and the Soviet Union during the beginning of the John F. Kennedy administration. President Kennedy’s brother, Attorney General Robert F. Kennedy, secretly met with Bolshakov on numerous occasions in 1961 in order to gain more information about Soviet intentions and convey messages from the administration to the top Soviet leadership, including Premier Nikita Khrushchev.  

Bolshakov was thus a vital back-channel contact between the American and Soviet governments. The Kennedy administration used him to set up the Vienna Summit in June 1961 and, even more importantly, to defuse and resolve the Berlin Crisis in October of that year.

A more precise evaluation of the level and impact of Bolshakov’s role in US-Soviet diplomacy awaits further release of archival records.

Notes and references

К.Таривердиев.Карибский кризис 
И.Хлебников.КАРИБСКИЙ КРИЗИС:ПЕРЕЛОМ 
А.Фурсенко.ГЕОРГИЙ БОЛЬШАКОВ - СВЯЗНОЙ ХРУЩЕВА С ПРЕЗИДЕНТОМ КЕННЕДИ 

1922 births
1989 deaths
Soviet diplomats
GRU officers
Soviet Union–United States relations